Behar Maliqi (born 22 September 1986) is a Kosovar footballer who plays as a defensive midfielder for KF Llapi in the Football Superleague of Kosovo.

References

1986 births
Living people
Sportspeople from Pristina
Kosovo Albanians
Association football midfielders
Kosovan footballers
Kosovo pre-2014 international footballers
KF KEK players
FC Prishtina players
FK Partizani Tirana players
KF Feronikeli players
KF Llapi players
Football Superleague of Kosovo players
Kategoria Superiore players
Kosovan expatriate footballers
Expatriate footballers in Albania
Kosovan expatriate sportspeople in Albania